Lights Out is the sixth studio album by English rock band UFO, released in 1977. All songs are band originals except for "Alone Again Or" which is a cover of a song by the band Love. Reaching number 23 on the Billboard 200, it remains the band's highest-charting album in the United States. In the UK it hit number 54 and stayed on the chart for two weeks.

The album was UFO's first to feature lush string arrangements alongside more complex song structures than their previous albums. Producer Ron Nevison brought in Alan McMillan to handle the string and horn arrangements. The most notable song to feature the orchestral colouring was "Love to Love". It is also the first UFO album to feature Paul Raymond on keyboards and rhythm guitar.

In 1994, a CD comprising this album and No Heavy Petting was released by BGO Records. 2008 EMI's remastered edition includes four live bonus tracks recorded at The Roundhouse, London. The album cover erroneously states that these tracks were recorded in 1976, but the correct year is 1977. EMI did correct the writing credits, with Paul Raymond finally being credited for his contributions.

The title track and "Love to Love" were featured in the 1999 movie Detroit Rock City. "Love to Love" was also covered by Djali Zwan for the 2002 movie Spun and by Europe for their 2008 live album Almost Unplugged. An instrumental version of "Too Hot to Handle" is used at the beginning of Mark Madden's radio show on WXDX-FM in Pittsburgh, Madden being a longtime fan of UFO.

Kerrang! magazine listed the album at No. 28 among the "100 Greatest Heavy Metal Albums of All Time".

Steve Harris of Iron Maiden called "Love to Love" his favourite song.

Track listing

The date of the live show stated on the album cover and booklet is incorrect. The show was on 2 April 1977, not in 1976.

Personnel
UFO
Phil Mogg – vocals
Michael Schenker – lead guitar
Paul Raymond – keyboards, rhythm guitar, backing vocals
Pete Way – bass
Andy Parker – drums

Production
Ron Nevison – producer
Alan McMillan – horn arrangements, string arrangements
Hipgnosis – cover art

Charts

References

UFO (band) albums
1977 albums
Albums produced by Ron Nevison
Chrysalis Records albums
Albums with cover art by Hipgnosis